Paul Kostacopoulos (born November 28, 1964) is an American college baseball coach. He has been the head coach of the Navy Midshipmen since the start of the 2006 season. Prior to Navy, he was the head coach at both Maine and Providence. With the three programs, Kostacopoulos has appeared in a total of five NCAA Tournaments.

Kostacopoulos played college baseball at Providence from 1984 to 1987.

Coaching career

Providence
After two seasons as an assistant at Providence, Kostacopoulos became the head coach for the start of the 1990 season. Kostacopoulos's first postseason appearance came in the 1991 Big East Tournament. Providence then won the tournament in 1992 to advance to the 1992 NCAA Tournament, where it went 1–2 and won its second-round game against South Alabama. In 1995, Providence won the Big East regular season title and received an at-large bid to the 1995 NCAA Tournament, where it went 0–2. Kostacopoulos was named the 1995 Big East Coach of the Year, New England Coach of the Year, and ABCA Northeast Region Coach of the Year.

Three future Major League Baseball players played under Kostacopoulos at Providence. Lou Merloni (1990–1993) was named conference co-Rookie of the Year in 1990 and conference Player of the Year in 1993. John McDonald (1995–1996) and Keith Reed (1996) also played under Kostacopoulos.

Maine
Kostacopoulos left Providence to become the head coach of Maine for the start of the 1997 season. He replaced John Winkin, under whom Maine had appeared in six College World Series. In his first four seasons as head coach (1997–2000), Maine finished higher than fourth in the America East only once. In his last five (2001–2005), the team did not finish lower than second and qualified for two NCAA Tournaments (2002 and 2005) by winning the America East Tournament in those seasons.

Kostacopoulos was named America East Coach of the Year for second-place conference finishes in 1997 and 2001.

Navy
Kostacopoulos was hired as the head coach of Navy for the start of the 2006 season. As of the end of the 2013 season, Navy has appeared in one NCAA Tournament under Kostacopoulos. The appearance came in 2011, when Navy won both the Patriot League regular season and tournament championships. He was named the 2011  and 2015 Patriot League Coach of the Year.

Head coaching record
Below is a table of Kostacopoulos's yearly records as an NCAA head baseball coach.

See also
 List of current NCAA Division I baseball coaches

References

1964 births
Living people
Maine Black Bears baseball coaches
Navy Midshipmen baseball coaches
Providence Friars baseball coaches
Providence Friars baseball players
Sportspeople from Middletown, Connecticut
Baseball coaches from Connecticut